Newsbreak is an online news and current affairs magazine published in the Philippines. It began as a weekly print magazine that was published from January 24, 2001, to 2006. The Newsbreak website, launched in 2006, now functions as the investigative and research arm of online news organization Rappler.

Newsbreak has published stories covering various issues that concern Congress, the presidency, the security sector, the judiciary, the media, local governments, elections, business, and the economy. The magazine is most notable as a watchdog, having published investigative reports on social ills and corruption. Newsbreaks writers have consistently been nominated for the Jaime V. Ongpin awards since its inception.

Since its migration online, Newsbreak has come out with various special editions covering topics such as the 2007 Philippine elections, scandals involving the Ninoy Aquino International Airport Terminal 3, and corporate social responsibility, to name a few (see links below). It was previously a partner of the media corporation, ABS-CBN, where it managed the website of its news and current affairs division, abs-cbnNEWS.com.

Awards
Newsbreak, on June 26, 2008, received the top awards in the 19th Jaime V. Ongpin Awards for Excellence in Journalism, the most prestigious award for journalism in the Philippines. Glenda Gloria's "Trapped in a Web of Lives" and Roel Landingin's "The Battle for Manila's Gateway," both published by Newsbreak magazine, won the top prizes. The Canadian Embassy gave the Marshall McLuhan Prize to Gloria for Newsbreak. Her prize included a study tour of Canada. The Australian Embassy bestowed the Australian Ambassador's Award, a travel grant, to Newsbreak's Landingin.

Newsbreak also won the Jaime V. Ongpin Award in 2001 for its investigative reporting on the unexplained wealth of Makati mayor Jejomar Binay. The piece was written by its current assistant managing editor Miriam Grace Go. In 2007, Newsbreak's Carmela Fonbuena won the Jaime V. Ongpin Award for Explanatory Writing Category for her article "Seeing Red." Aries Rufo also gained recognition from the same award-giving body in 2004 for his work, "Sins of the Father."

Go and Rufo placed third in the Asian Development Bank in its Developing Asia Journalism Awards, which was held in Tokyo in 2004.

Recognition
Newsbreaks co-founder and editor-in-chief, Marites Dañguilan Vitug, was named number 45 in the Eurasia Group Global Leaders 50 of 2006. Ethical Corporation also gave recognition to Newsbreaks Business Editor, Lala Rimando, as one of the 15 leaders who made a difference in 2007, sharing the limelight with the likes of former US President Bill Clinton and former US Vice President Al Gore.

In its review of the magazine, The New York Times characterized Newsbreak as a publication that challenges taboos. Likewise, Foreign Policy described Newsbreak as "comprehensive…and helps place the ordinary lives of Mindanao’s people in a political context."

Special editions
 What we've learned: our post 2007 elections special
 Trafficked! Why are we losing our women?
 Transparency in Government
 Dirty Deal: the A to Z of the Ninoy Aquino International Airport Terminal 3
 Corporate Social Responsibility
 The Big Dig: Mining Rush Rakes up Tons of Conflict

Beyond the Stories

Newsbreak: Beyond the Stories is a weekly investigative magazine podcast of Newsbreak/Rappler. It tackles issues on controversies related to current events and politics. It is hosted by Rappler writer/researcher Jodesz Gavilan.

References

External links
 Editors Tackle Taboos With Girlish Glee (New York Times)
 Ethical leaders: Best of the best – 15 leaders who made a difference in 2007
 What is Newsbreak?

2001 establishments in the Philippines
2006 disestablishments in the Philippines
Defunct magazines published in the Philippines
Magazines established in 2001
Magazines disestablished in 2006
News magazines published in Asia
Online magazines with defunct print editions
Weekly magazines
Political podcasts